United Zinc & Chemical Co. v. Britt, 258 U.S. 268 (1922), was a case decided by the Supreme Court of the United States that limited liability for landowners regarding injuries to child trespassers.

Holding
The court held that a landowner was not liable under the attractive nuisance doctrine if the child had not been attracted to the land by the condition that injured him. This case has since been overturned.

See also
List of United States Supreme Court cases, volume 258

External links
 

United States tort case law
United States Supreme Court cases
United States Supreme Court cases of the Taft Court
Overruled United States Supreme Court decisions
1922 in United States case law